James Britton may refer to:

 James H. Britton (1817–1900), mayor of St. Louis, Missouri, United States
 James Britton (painter) (1878–1936), American painter and art critic
 James Clelland Britton (1903–1984), Canadian diplomat in the 1950s and 1960s
 Jim Britton (born 1944), American baseball pitcher
 James N. Britton (1908–1994), British educator